WNCD is a commercial radio station serving Youngstown, Ohio, owned by iHeartMedia, Inc. and broadcasting a mainstream rock format at 93.3 MHz. Its signal covers Youngstown, Warren, and New Castle, PA, and at times even reaches Erie and New Kensington, Pennsylvania (Pittsburgh market). However, as one approaches Meadville and points east, a station from Jamestown, New York starts to interfere with WNCD's signal. WNCD goes by the nickname "93.3 The Wolf".

WNCD's morning programming comes from Rover's Morning Glory, from 6am to 10am. Until May 2007, the station's playlist featured an active rock format, playing classic rock from artists such as Led Zeppelin, Ozzy Osbourne, Guns N' Roses, AC/DC and Metallica, while playing new rock from bands like Nickelback, Mudvayne, Breaking Benjamin, Staind, Disturbed, Tool, Chevelle, Three Days Grace, Linkin Park, Puddle of Mudd and Seether. Since 2007, WNCD has played more classic rock than new rock and is considered a Mainstream Rock Station.  The station primarily competes with WYFM  for listeners. The station secondarily competes with WONE from Akron, WRQK from Canton, WNCX and WMMS from Cleveland, and WDVE and WXDX from Pittsburgh.

History
Prior to August 30, 2000, WNCD was "CD106 the Wolf", located at 106.1 on the FM dial and licensed to nearby Niles, Ohio.

At one time, WNCD simulcast its signal on WLLF 96.7 FM in Mercer, Pennsylvania, aiming for listeners in the eastern part of the Youngstown market into Western Pennsylvania.  WLLF still carries the "Wolf"-derived calls today, despite new ownership and numerous format changes.

After coming under common ownership with sister WBBG, WNCD traded for the much stronger 93.3 frequency. In the past, the station has been branded as "CD 93.3 The Wolf" and "93.3 NCD", the latter name being derived from fellow iHeartMedia Mainstream rock station WDVE in Pittsburgh which goes by the name "102.5 DVE".

Back to the Wolf
In May 2007, WNCD switched branding again, going back to 93.3 The Wolf from the previous 93.3 NCD with an updated "Wolf" mascot in the logo.

External links
93.3 The Wolf official website
Bob & Tom Show
Cleveland Browns Football

NCD
Mainstream rock radio stations in the United States
IHeartMedia radio stations